Myer Hoffman (21 July 1902 in Leeds, Yorkshire, England – 14 October 1959 in Lourenço Marques, Mozambique) was an English-born Irish cricketer. A right-handed batsman and right-arm medium pace bowler, he played one first-class match, for Dublin University against Northamptonshire in July 1925.

References 

1902 births
1959 deaths
Irish cricketers
Dublin University cricketers